Aghkand-e Olya (also Romanized as Āghkand-e ‘Olyā and Āgh Kand-e ‘Olyā; also known as Āghkand-e Bālā, Ahkand Bāla, and Āq Kand-e Bālā) is a village in Babarashani Rural District, Chang Almas District, Bijar County, Kurdistan Province, Iran. At the 2006 census, its population was 178, in 34 families. The village is populated by Kurds.

References 

Towns and villages in Bijar County
Kurdish settlements in Kurdistan Province